The 1908 Oklahoma A&M Aggies football team represented Oklahoma A&M College in the 1908 college football season. This was the eighth year of football at A&M and the first under Ed Parry. The Aggies played their home games in Stillwater, Oklahoma. They finished the season 4–4.

Schedule

References

Oklahoma AandM
Oklahoma State Cowboys football seasons
Oklahoma AandM Aggies football